Kelso is a city in the southwestern part of the U.S. state of Washington and is the county seat of Cowlitz County.  At the 2020 census, the population was 12,720.  Kelso is part of the Longview, Washington Metropolitan statistical area, which has a population of 110,730.  Kelso shares its long western border with Longview.  It is near Mount St. Helens.

History
The earliest known inhabitants of Kelso were Native Americans from the Cowlitz tribe. The Cowlitz people were separated into the Upper (or Taidnapam) and Lower (or Mountain) Cowlitz tribes, who were members of the Sahaptin and Salish language families, respectively.  In 1855, European explorers noted that there numbered over 6,000 individuals of the Cowlitz Tribe.

Kelso was founded by Peter W. Crawford, a Scottish surveyor, who, in 1847, took up the first donation land claim on the Lower Cowlitz River.  Crawford platted a townsite which he named after his home town of Kelso, Scotland. The original plat was dated and filed in October 1884.  It became incorporated in 1889.

In its early days, Kelso obtained the nickname "Little Chicago" as it became famous for its large number of taverns and brothels that catered to local loggers. On weekends, trainloads of loggers would come into town from the surrounding region looking for women, liquor, gambling and fights. The FBI finally forced the mayor to shut them down in the 1950s, with the last tavern/brothel closing in the mid-1960s.  The economy continues to be based largely on wood products.

In the late 19th century and into the first part of the 20th century, Kelso was the center for commercial smelt fishing on the Cowlitz River.  In 1910, according to the Oregonian Newspaper, 5,000 tons of fish were caught.  The Kelso Chamber of Commerce created the slogan in 1956 and became known as the Smelt Capital of the World.  The Cowlitz River has historically had heavy runs of smelt and were shipped to markets around the country. Smelt numbers have declined significantly in the past several decades possibly due to overharvesting, global climate change and habitat loss.

Pieces of the mysterious 1947 Maury Island incident took place in Kelso.  A military aircraft carrying suspicious slag-like material, supposedly from a UFO, crashed in southeast Kelso.

Called the largest volcanic eruption in historic times in the contiguous United States, Kelso received large amounts of volcanic ash through the air and from the massive mudflow caused by the eruption transported by the Toutle and Cowlitz Rivers. Many areas of the city, including the Three Rivers Golf Course are built on volcanic ash dredged from the Cowlitz River by inmates in state custody and volunteers.

In March 1998, the Aldercrest-Banyon landslide began shifting the foundations of 64 homes and local infrastructure in the east Kelso neighborhood of Aldercrest.  Eventually, 129 houses were destroyed by this slow-moving landslide. Investigation showed that these houses had been built on top of an ancient active landslide area, and three straight years of higher-than-average rains set the earth into motion.
In October 1998, President Bill Clinton declared this slide a federal disaster.  It was the second worst landslide disaster (in cost) in the United States, following the 1956 Portuguese Bend Landslide on Palos Verdes Hills in Southern California. This disaster at Aldercrest led to stricter city zoning ordinances and oversight over geological surveys.

National Register of Historic Places
 Adam Catlin House
 Nat Smith House
 US Post Office - Kelso Main

Geography

Kelso is situated on the east side of the Cowlitz River near the Columbia River, opposite from its twin city of Longview on the west bank.

The Columbia, Cowlitz, and Coweeman rivers were used as part of a historical transportation route from Portland, Oregon, to the Puget Sound. Cowlitz steamboats were used as a mode of transportation until 1918.

Climate

Neighborhoods
 Aldercrest
 Butler Acres
 Davis Terrace
 East Kelso
 Hilltop
 Lexington
 Mt. Brynion
 North Kelso
 Old Kelso Hill
 South Kelso
 West Kelso
 Rose Valley
 Mt Pleasant

Government

Kelso operates under a city charter and is classified as a code city with a council—manager form of government. The city council has seven members elected by residents, from which a mayor is chosen by its members every two years. Council positions are filled on an at-large basis and are held for four years, with council elections being held to fill either three or four positions in odd-numbered years. The council also selects a city manager; former Kelso police chief Andrew Hamilton was hired as city manager in 2019 after the departure of Steve Taylor.

Economy

With access to the Columbia River, Interstate 5, and several railways, Kelso supports a manufacturing base. The largest employer is the Kelso School District, followed by Foster Farms and Safeway.  Other large employers are Target, ALS Environmental laboratory, Western Fabrication, PAPE Machinery, and DSU Peterbilt.

Demographics

2010 census
As of the census of 2010, there were 11,925 people, 4,720 households, and 2,949 families residing in the city. The racial makeup of the city was 85.2% White, 0.8% African American, 2.1% Native American, 1.6% Asian, 0.1% Pacific Islander, 5.1% from other races, and 5.1% from two or more races. Hispanic or Latino of any race were 11.3% of the population.

There were 4,720 households, of which 34.9% had children under the age of 18 living with them, 37.9% were married couples living together, 17.4% had a female householder with no husband present, 7.2% had a male householder with no wife present, and 37.5% were non-families. 28.8% of all households were made up of individuals, and 9.5% had someone living alone who was 65 years of age or older. The average household size was 2.52 and the average family size was 3.05.

The median age in the city was 34.6 years. 26.3% of residents were under the age of 18; 10.3% were between the ages of 18 and 24; 26.7% were from 25 to 44; 24.8% were from 45 to 64; and 11.7% were 65 years of age or older. The gender makeup of the city was 48.8% male and 51.2% female.

2000 census
As of the census of 2000, there were 11,895 people, 4,616 households, and 2,991 families residing in the city. The population density was 1,471.6 people per square mile (568.4/km2). There were 5,067 housing units at an average density of 626.9 per square mile (242.1/km2). The racial makeup of the city was 90.14% White, 0.82% African American, 2.05% Native American, 0.94% Asian, 0.21% Pacific Islander, 3.12% from other races, and 2.72% from two or more races. Hispanic or Latino of any race were 6.93% of the population. 18.1% were of German, 9.3% Irish, 9.0% English, 7.7% American and 6.4% Norwegian ancestry.

There were 4,616 households, out of which 33.6% had children under the age of 18 living with them, 43.0% were married couples living together, 15.9% had a female householder with no husband present, and 35.2% were non-families. 28.3% of all households were made up of individuals, and 10.5% had someone living alone who was 65 years of age or older. The average household size was 2.52 and the average family size was 3.05.

In the city, the age distribution of the population shows 28.3% under the age of 18, 10.5% from 18 to 24, 29.0% from 25 to 44, 19.8% from 45 to 64, and 12.3% who were 65 years of age or older. The median age was 33 years. For every 100 females, there were 99.6 males. For every 100 females age 18 and over, there were 98.8 males.

The median income for a household in the city was $29,722, and the median income for a family was $36,784. Males had a median income of $36,271 versus $23,750 for females. The per capita income for the city was $15,162. About 16.4% of families and 19.8% of the population were below the poverty line, including 25.1% of those under age 18 and 11.2% of those age 65 or over.

Education

The Kelso School District manages public schools in the city and surrounding areas and has an enrollment of 4,715 students. It has three high schools, including Kelso High School, two middle schools, and seven elementary schools.

Transportation

Road
Interstate 5, the main north–south highway on the West Coast of the United States, runs through Kelso. Two highways, State Route 4 and State Route 432, connect Kelso to Longview via crossings of the Cowlitz River.

Rail
Amtrak, the national passenger rail system, provides service to the twin cities of Kelso-Longview.  The Amtrak station is located in the Kelso Multimodal Transportation Center along the Cowlitz River.

Bus
The cities of Kelso and Longview are served by RiverCities Transit.

Kelso is also served by Greyhound Bus Lines, which provides intercity bus service at the Kelso Multimodal Transportation Center.

Air
Kelso is served by Southwest Washington Regional Airport, formerly known as Kelso-Longview Regional Airport.

Sports and recreation
Kelso and Longview are the home of the Cowlitz Black Bears baseball team.  The Black Bears play in the West Coast League, an independent summer baseball league with teams from Washington, Oregon, and British Columbia.  The team plays at David Story Field on the Lower Columbia College campus.

The largest park is Tam o'Shanter Park, a multi-use park comprising  along the Coweeman River. The facilities include multipurpose fields for soccer, three girls fastpitch softball fields, one Babe Ruth field, five Cal Ripken baseball fields, and three basketball courts. The park hosts the annual Kelso Hilander Festival which includes Scottish Highland games. The park is named after a Scottish bonnet, the Tam o' shanter.

Media
Kelso has four FM (KUKN, K268BN, KLOG and KTJC) and one AM (KLOG) radio stations licensed in the city.

Kelso is provided with cable television from nearby Longview.

Kelso's primary newspaper is The Daily News, which won a 1981 Pulitzer Prize for its coverage of the St. Helens eruption.

Sister cities
Kelso has the two sister cities:
 Kelso, Scottish Borders, Scotland, United Kingdom
 Makinohara, Japan

Notable people

 Jeff Bailey, baseball player
 Dolores Erickson, fashion model
 Colin Kelly, football player
 Sharry Konopski, model and actress
 Trevor May, baseball player
 Tommy Lloyd, basketball coach
 Ed Negre, racecar driver
 Brian O'Connor, musician
 David Richie, football player
 Jason Schmidt, baseball player
 Sid Snyder, state legislator
 Connor Trinneer, actor

See also
Impact of the 2019–20 coronavirus pandemic on the meat industry in the United States

References

External links

City of Kelso
Cowlitz County Historical Museum

Cities in Washington (state)
Cities in Cowlitz County, Washington
County seats in Washington (state)
Populated places established in 1884
Washington (state) populated places on the Columbia River
1884 establishments in Washington Territory